More to Life Than This is the third solo album by former White Lion and Freak of Nature lead singer, Mike Tramp, released on March 17, 2003.

Background and recording
The album was recorded in Copenhagen, Tramp once again produced the album himself but relied on producer/engineer Flemming Rasmussen (Metallica) to engineer and mix the sessions in his own Sweet Silence Studios.

Following a guest appearance on Tramp's last solo album, Recovering the Wasted Years, Oliver Steffenson, a lifelong friend of Tramp who was involved with the very early stages of White Lion and also with Tramp formed Freak of Nature, joins Tramp's solo band.

Release and promotion
The album's title track  and "Don't Want to Say Good Night" were released as singles off the album. A music video made in Australia was released for the song "Lay Down My Life for You".

Following the release of the album, Tramp continued his attempt to reform the original White Lion line up, but by the end of 2003 had given up on the reunion and moved on with a new White Lion line up in 2004.

Track listing

Personnel
 Mike Tramp – vocals, electric guitar, acoustic guitar 
 Oliver Steffensen – Guitar
 Kasper Damgaard – guitar
 Claus Langeskov – bass guitar  
 Kasper Foss – drums 
 Dan Hemmer – Hammond B-3

Additional musicians
 Todd Wolfe – guitar  
 Steve Lukather – guitar solo on track 8
 Eric Johnson – Guitar solo on track 10
 Nicholas Findsen – bass guitar

References

2003 albums
Mike Tramp albums